Blacksmith Run is a stream in McKean County, Pennsylvania, in the United States.

History
Blacksmith Run was named for the fact an early blacksmith had a shop there.

See also
List of rivers of Pennsylvania

References

Rivers of McKean County, Pennsylvania
Rivers of Pennsylvania